Nephrurus stellatus, also known as the stellate knob-tailed gecko, starry knob-tailed gecko, or southern knob-tailed gecko, is a species of gecko in the family Carphodactylidae. It is endemic to southern Australia.

Geographic range
N. stellatus is found in the arid regions of the Eyre Peninsula and southern Western Australia.

The holotype was collected near Southern Cross, Western Australia.

Taxonomy
The original description of this species was by Glen Milton Storr in 1968.

References

Further reading
Storr GM. 1968. Nephrurus stellatus, a new knob-tailed gecko from southern Australia. Western Australian Naturalist 10: 181–182.

External links

Geckos of Australia
Nephrurus
Taxa named by Glen Milton Storr
Reptiles described in 1968